Luigi Paterlini (9 August 1923 – 23 October 1974) was an Italian sprinter. He competed in the men's 4 × 400 metres relay at the 1948 Summer Olympics.

References

External links
 

1923 births
1974 deaths
Athletes (track and field) at the 1948 Summer Olympics
Italian male sprinters
Olympic athletes of Italy
Place of birth missing
Italian Athletics Championships winners